Mangelia hesperia is an extinct species of sea snail, a marine gastropod mollusc in the family Mangeliidae.

Description

Distribution
This extinct marine species was found in Pliocene strata of the Canoa Formation in Ecuador; age range: 5.332 to 2.588 Ma

References

 H. A. Pilsbry and A.A. Olsson. 1941. A Pliocene fauna from Western Ecuador. Proceedings of the Natural Sciences of Philadelphia 93:1-79

External links

hesperia
Gastropods described in 1941